Francisco de Garay (1475 in Sopuerta, Biscay – 1523) was a Spanish Basque conquistador.  He was a companion to Christopher Columbus on his second voyage to the New World and arrived in Hispaniola in 1493. Here he attracted attention when he encountered a large gold nugget worth four thousand pesos. In 1496, Miguel Diaz and Francisco de Garay found gold nuggets along the Haina River.

Early life
Garay was born in the Garay tower in Sopuerta, in the county of Encartaciones located in the province of Biscay.

Jamaica
From 1514 to 1523, Garay served as Royal Governor of Santiago, now Jamaica (Governor of Jamaica). As a Governor of Santiago he was accused of committing genocide of the island's indigenous population whom he enslaved and sent to work in the gold mines of Cuba. Writing in 1516, Bartolomé de Las Casas accused him of being responsible for the great decline of the indigenous population. By 1519, the original population of Jamaica was almost eradicated. He also raised pigs during his governorship, at one point employing five thousand indigenous to herd his swine.

Expeditions
Garay sent several expeditions to explore, map and claim lands along the shores of what is now the Gulf of Mexico from present day Florida to Mexico. In 1519 Garay sent an expedition under Alonso Álvarez de Pineda to map the coast between Florida and the northern limit of the lands visited by Diego Velázquez de Cuéllar.  The Mississippi River was shown on the maps as Rio del Espiritu Santo (River of the Holy Spirit).

In 1523, Garay led a 600-man expedition to found a colony on the Panuco River near present-day Tampico.  However, he landed by mistake 100 miles north at the mouth of the Soto La Marina River which he called the River of Palms (Rio de las Palmas).  He reconnoitered by sending a small boat upriver about 25 miles, probably reaching the site of the present day city of Soto la Marina.  The explorers found 40 Indian encampments along the river, indicating a large population, although the Indians apparently did not practice agriculture.  The Indians plied the river in canoes and, although initially friendly, became hostile.  Realizing that the river was not the Pánuco, Garay ordered an overland march southward to the Panuco.

Garay's efforts to found a colony led him into legal conflict with Hernán Cortés.

While in Mexico City negotiating with Cortés, he became ill and died on December 27, 1523.

References 

 Eugenio Del Hoyo; Historia del El Nuevo Reino De Leon (1577-1723)

Bibliography

External links 
Texas State Historical Association (TSHA): Francisco de Garay biography

Basque conquistadors
Spanish explorers
Spanish colonial governors and administrators
People of the Spanish colonial Americas
People of New Spain
Colony of Santiago
16th-century Spanish people
1475 births
1523 deaths
History of Hispaniola
Spanish West Indies
People from Enkarterri